Daniil Silinskiy (born 6 January 2000) is a Belarusian professional footballer who plays for Energetik-BGU Minsk.

References

External links 
 
 

2000 births
Living people
People from Baranavichy
Sportspeople from Brest Region
Belarusian footballers
Association football midfielders
FC Baranovichi players
FC Slonim-2017 players
FC Smorgon players
FC Energetik-BGU Minsk players